The 2018 Africa Women's Sevens was a women's rugby sevens tournament held in Gaborone, Botswana on 26–27 May 2018.

Kenya as the highest ranked team qualified for the 2018 Dubai Women's Sevens and 2019 Hong Kong Women's Sevens. Uganda also qualified for 2019 Hong Kong Women's Sevens.

Teams

South Africa was initially scheduled to compete, but pulled out to prepare for the 2018 Rugby World Cup Sevens.

Pool stage

All times in Central Africa Time (UTC+02:00)

Pool A

Pool B

Pool C

Knockout stage

Placement Match

Fifth Place

Cup

Standings

See also

 2019 Hong Kong Women's Sevens

References

2018
2018 rugby sevens competitions
2018 in African rugby union
rugby union
2018 in women's rugby union